The 2015 Hall of Fame Tennis Championships was a men's tennis tournament played on outdoor grass courts. It was the 40th edition of the Hall of Fame Tennis Championships, and part of the ATP World Tour 250 series of the 2015 ATP World Tour. It took place at the International Tennis Hall of Fame in Newport, Rhode Island, United States, from July 13 through July 19, 2015.

Former world No. 8 and two-time Grand Slam finalist Mark Philippoussis contested his first match on the ATP World Tour in nine years after receiving a wild card into qualifying. He was 38 years of age.

Singles main draw entrants

Seeds 

 1 Rankings are as of June 29, 2015

Other entrants 
The following players received wildcards into the singles main draw:
  Tommy Haas
  Noah Rubin
  Bernard Tomic

The following players received entry from the qualifying draw:
  Adrien Bossel
  Matthew Ebden
  Jan Hernych
  Ante Pavić

Withdrawals 
Before the tournament
  Ivan Dodig →replaced by Jared Donaldson
  James Duckworth →replaced by Illya Marchenko
  Sam Groth →replaced by Yūichi Sugita
  Nicolas Mahut →replaced by Niels Desein
  Go Soeda →replaced by Édouard Roger-Vasselin
  Donald Young →replaced by Ryan Harrison

Retirements 
  Jan Hernych

Doubles main draw entrants

Seeds 

 Rankings are as of June 29, 2015

Other entrants 
The following pairs received wildcards into the doubles main draw:
  Marco Chiudinelli  /  Frederik Nielsen
  Ryan Harrison /  Mark Philippoussis

Finals

Singles 

  Rajeev Ram defeated  Ivo Karlović, 7–6(7–5), 5–7, 7–6(7–2)

Doubles 

  Jonathan Marray /  Aisam-ul-Haq Qureshi defeated  Nicholas Monroe /  Mate Pavić, 4–6, 6–3, [10–8]

References

External links